The Enchanted World of Brambly Hedge is a stop-motion animated series based on the eight Brambly Hedge books by Jill Barklem. The show was produced by HIT Entertainment; in the United States, episodes began airing on the Starz premium channel in 1997.

Cast

Episodes

References

External links

Toonhound page

1996 British television series debuts
2000 British television series endings
1990s British animated television series
2000s British animated television series
British children's animated fantasy television series
BBC children's television shows
British stop-motion animated television series
Television series by Cosgrove Hall Films
HIT Entertainment
Television series by Mattel Creations
English-language television shows
Animated television series about mice and rats